Gerda Becker (born 1956 or 1957) is a retired Dutch table tennis player from Rotterdam. She competed at the 1976 and 1980 Summer Paralympics in the individual and team events and won two gold, one silver and one bronze medal.

References

Year of birth missing (living people)
Dutch female table tennis players
Table tennis players at the 1976 Summer Paralympics
Table tennis players at the 1980 Summer Paralympics
Paralympic table tennis players of the Netherlands
Medalists at the 1976 Summer Paralympics
Medalists at the 1980 Summer Paralympics
Paralympic medalists in table tennis
Paralympic gold medalists for the Netherlands
Paralympic silver medalists for the Netherlands
Paralympic bronze medalists for the Netherlands
Living people
1950s births
Sportspeople from Rotterdam
20th-century Dutch women
20th-century Dutch people